Maksim Semerkhanov (born 1 August 1975) is a Russian sailor. He competed in the Laser event at the 2004 Summer Olympics. In 2021, he won the silver medal at the World Military Sailing Championship.

References

External links
 

1975 births
Living people
Russian male sailors (sport)
Olympic sailors of Russia
Sailors at the 2004 Summer Olympics – Laser
Place of birth missing (living people)